Nicola "Nico" Zahner (born 2 August 1994) is a German footballer who plays as a midfielder for TSG Hofherrnweiler.

Career
Zahner made his professional debut for VfR Aalen in the 3. Liga on 21 November 2015, coming on as a substitute in the 81st minute for Alexandros Kartalis in the 0–1 away loss against Mainz 05 II.

References

External links
 Profile at DFB.de
 Profile at kicker.de
 Nico Zahner at FuPa

1994 births
Living people
People from Aalen
Sportspeople from Stuttgart (region)
Footballers from Baden-Württemberg
German footballers
Association football midfielders
VfR Aalen players
3. Liga players